The 2012 United States presidential election in Alabama took place on November 6, 2012, as part of the 2012 general election, in which all 50 states plus the District of Columbia participated. Alabama voters chose nine electors to represent them in the Electoral College via a popular vote pitting incumbent Democratic President Barack Obama and his running mate, Vice President Joe Biden, against Republican challenger and former Massachusetts Governor Mitt Romney and his running mate, Congressman Paul Ryan.

In 2008, Alabama was won by Republican nominee John McCain with a 21.58% margin of victory. Prior to the election, 17 news organizations considered this a state Romney would win, or otherwise considered it a safe red state. Located in the Deep South, Alabama is one of the most conservative states in the country. Alabama has not gone Democratic since it was won by Jimmy Carter in 1976.

Romney won the election in Alabama with 60.55% of the vote, while Obama received 38.36%, a 22.19% margin of victory. While the state swung slightly more Republican from 2008, Obama flipped two McCain counties, Barbour and Conecuh, into the Democratic column, thereby making it the last time either county voted for a Democratic presidential candidate as of the 2020 presidential election.

Primaries

Democratic 
On March 13, 2012, the Alabama Democratic Party held statewide primaries to select delegates for the Democratic nomination, taking place on the same day as the Mississippi Democratic primary and the Utah Democratic caucuses. Incumbent Barack Obama ran unopposed. However, voters also had the option of voting "uncommitted" rather than supporting Obama. Of the 286,780 votes cast, 241,167 (84.09%) were for Obama and 45,613 (15.91%) were uncommitted. Out of the 63 pledged delegates, 55 went to Obama and 8 were uncommitted. The floor vote at the Democratic National Convention allocated all of Alabama's 69 delegates to Obama. Obama won all but 6 counties in the state.

Republican 

The 2012 Alabama Republican primary took place on March 13, 2012, on the same day as the Mississippi Republican primary and the Hawaii Republican caucuses. Rick Santorum was declared the winner.

General election

Polling 

Opinion polls that have been taken in Alabama have consistently showed Mitt Romney to be leading Barack Obama.

Predictions
The latest predictions:

Cook Political Report: Solid Republican
Electoral-vote.com: Strongly Republican
Real Clear Politics: Safe Romney
CNN: Safe Romney
MSNBC: Republican
The Washington Post: Solid Republican
270 to win: Safe Romney
 Belanger Report: Safe Romney
FiveThirtyEight: Solid Romney

Candidate ballot access 
 Barack Hussein Obama / Joseph Robinette Biden, Jr., Democratic
 Willard Mitt Romney / Paul Davis Ryan, Republican
 Gary Earl Johnson / James Polin Gray, Libertarian
 Jill Ellen Stein / Cheri Lynn Honkala, Green
 Virgil Hamlin Goode, Jr. / James N. Clymer, Constitution
Write-in candidate access: 
 Ross Carl "Rocky" Anderson / Luis Javier Rodriguez, Justice
 Andre Nigel Barnett / Ken Cross, Reform

Results

Results by county

Counties that flipped from Republican to Democratic 
 Barbour (largest city: Eufaula)
 Conecuh (largest city: Evergreen)

By congressional district
Romney won 6 of 7 congressional districts.

See also 
 List of 2012 United States presidential electors
 2008 United States presidential election in Alabama
 2012 Republican Party presidential debates and forums
 2012 Republican Party presidential primaries
 Results of the 2012 Republican Party presidential primaries
 Alabama Democratic Party
 Alabama Republican Party
 United States presidential elections in Alabama

References

External links
Official website of the Alabama Republican Party
Official website of the Alabama Democratic Party
Official website of the Alabama Green Party
The Green Papers: for Alabama
The Green Papers: Major state elections in chronological order

Alabama
United States president
2012